Roger Federer defeated James Blake in the final, 6–1, 6–4 to win the men's singles tennis title at the 2007 Cincinnati Masters.

Andy Roddick was the defending champion, but lost in the third round to David Ferrer.

Seeds
The top eight seeds received a bye into the second round.

Draw

Finals

Top half

Section 1

Section 2

Bottom half

Section 3

Section 4

Qualifying

Qualifying seeds

Qualifiers

Qualifying draw

First qualifier

Second qualifier

Third qualifier

Fourth qualifier

Fifth qualifier

Sixth qualifier

Seventh qualifier

References

External links
Draw
Qualifying draw
ITF tournament profile

Singles